"We Got the Love" is a song written by Steve Bogard and Rick Giles and recorded by the American country music group Restless Heart.  It was released in May 1993 as the fourth single from their album Big Iron Horses. The song reached number 11 on the Billboard Hot Country Singles & Tracks chart in August 1993.  Former Eagles and Nitty Gritty Dirt Band member Bernie Leadon plays banjo on this track.

Chart performance

References

1993 singles
Restless Heart songs
Song recordings produced by Josh Leo
RCA Records Nashville singles
Songs written by Steve Bogard
Songs written by Rick Giles
1992 songs